The NIHL South Division 1 is the top-level league in the Southern Region of the British National Ice Hockey League setup.

It forms one of four NIHL divisions, of a total of 43 teams, which are divided regionally.

The NIHL was reorganised for the start of the 2017-18 season, and South Division 1 features nine teams. The closing of the English Premier League meant that Basingstoke Bison, Swindon Wildcats, Bracknell Bees and Peterborough Phantoms joined the division, as the NIHL came to be the second tier of British ice hockey instead of the third.

The combination of semi-professional teams from the former EPL with largely amateur teams from the old NIHL South Division created pressure, with several teams preferring to play in South Division 2, in the face of increased costs and an unnaturally tougher playing field.

At the end of the season, the top eight sides will play two-legged quarter-finals before the final four sides will contest a play-off weekend.

Promotion and relegation between divisions in both the north and south have been aligned, with both sides operating an automatic one up, one down system, but in year one there will be no automatic relegation from D1 South (Britton) to enable the division to return to ten teams.

2020/21 clubs

Teams' participations in other cups 
In June 2017, the NIHL confirmed there would be two new competitions alongside the league.

NIHL National Cup 
The NIHL National Cup, features twelves NIHL teams in four regional groups. Six teams from the NIHL South Division 1 will take part, in groups C and D.

Group A: Billingham Stars, Blackburn Hawks, Solway Sharks

Group B: Sheffield Steeldogs, Peterborough Phantoms, Hull Pirates

Group C: Invicta Dynamos, London Raiders, Streatham IHC

Group D: Basingstoke Bison, Bracknell Bees, Swindon Wildcats

Group matches are two home, two away, against the other teams for a total of eight games. The top two sides move to quarter-finals to be held in early 2018.

Autumn Trophy 
Six clubs will also take part in another competition, the Autumn Trophy, which is scheduled to conclude by early December. The teams will play initially in two groups, playing one home and one away, before semi-finals and a final. Teams from the NIHL South Division 1 will play in group B.

Group A: Basingstoke Bison, Peterborough Phantoms, Sheffield Steeldogs

Group B: Bracknell Bees, Hull Pirates, Swindon Wildcats

2016-17 standings

The last season featuring the old division structure was 2016-17, and finished with Chelmsford Chieftains topping the table.

References

NIHL